Girl's rhythmic team all-around competition at the 2010 Summer Youth Olympics was held at the Bishan Sports Hall.

Teams consist of four gymnasts whom all perform in each routine. There are two rounds, a preliminary and a final, with each round consisting of two routines. In the preliminary, each team completes one routine using four hoops and one routine using four ribbons. The four teams with the highest combined scores in the two routines advance to the final. There, they perform the two routines again. Scores from the preliminary are ignored, and the teams are ranked according to their combined score in the two finals routines.

Medalists

Qualification

Final

References
 Qualification
 Final

Gymnastics at the 2010 Summer Youth Olympics
Women's sports competitions in Singapore
2010 in women's gymnastics